Flintholm station is an S-train and Metro interchange junction station in Copenhagen, Denmark. It opened on 24 January 2004, and it is located in the west of Copenhagen where the Frederikssund S-train Line crosses the S-train Ring Line. It is located in fare zone 2.

The station has two levels. On the lower level the Ring Line runs roughly north–south with side platforms (tracks 11 and 12). On the upper level, tracks on Frederikssund Line and the Metro run on bridge constructions with a center platform for each above the ring line tracks. The bridges continue west of the station, above a bus terminal and the street Grøndals Parkvej towards Vanløse station.

A large monumental glass roof covers all the tracks and the bus terminal. The design of the station has earned it various awards, among others the European Steel Design Awards.

See also
 List of railway stations in Denmark

External links
 Flintholm Metro station on www.m.dk 
 Flintholm Metro station on www.m.dk 
 Flintholm Railway station on www.dsb.dk 

M1 (Copenhagen Metro) stations
M2 (Copenhagen Metro) stations
S-train (Copenhagen) stations
Railway stations opened in 2004
Railway stations in Denmark opened in the 21st century